Gordon Staples was an American violinist and past concertmaster for the Detroit Symphony Orchestra. He was known for his work as a leader and conductor of the string section on recording sessions for Motown Records during their heyday in the 1960s. Although not having attained the same level of fame as the label's better-known singers, his work on hundreds of Motown hit records has therefore been heard by millions of people all around the world. He released a Motown album of his own in 1970 with members of The Funk Brothers, Strung Out, credited to Gordon Staples and the String Thing.

External links
 Review of Strung Out on PopMatters website

Concertmasters
Living people
Year of birth missing (living people)
Musicians from Detroit
American male violinists
21st-century classical violinists
21st-century American male musicians
Male classical violinists
21st-century American violinists